Georgi Vladimirovich Ulyanov (born 12 September 1985) is a Russian former footballer.

Club career
He played for Shinnik Yaroslavl in the Russian Premier League.

References

1985 births
Living people
Footballers from Yaroslavl
Russian footballers
Dinaburg FC players
Russian expatriate footballers
Expatriate footballers in Latvia
FC Shinnik Yaroslavl players
Russian expatriate sportspeople in Latvia
Russian Premier League players
FC Daugava players
Association football defenders
FC Sheksna Cherepovets players